Ghantasala may refer to:

People
 Ghantasala (musician) (Ghantasala Venkateswara Rao, 1922-1974), Telugu singer and composer
 Ghantasala Balaramayya (1906 - after 1952), Telugu film producer and director
 Ghantasala Sai Srinivas, professionally known as S. Thaman, an Indian music composer

Places
 Ghantasala, Krishna district, Andhra Pradesh, India
 Ghantasala mandal

Indian given names

te:ఘంటసాల